Fort Armistead was a United States Army coastal defense fort, active from 1901 to 1920, that defended Baltimore, Maryland.

History
Fort Armistead was built from 1897 to 1901 as part of the large-scale Endicott Program. Other forts of this era in the Coast Defenses of Baltimore include Fort Howard, Fort Carroll, and Fort Smallwood. Fort Armistead is in the Hawkins Point section of the city. The fort is named for Major George Armistead (1780-1818, later promoted to Colonel), commander of Fort McHenry during the Battle of Baltimore with the British Royal Navy attack in September 1814  in the War of 1812 that inspired "The Star-Spangled Banner" writing of the poem by Francis Scott Key that later set to music became the American national anthem in 1931. The battle and bombardment has since been celebrated annually by the city, county, and state as Defenders Day.

Fort Armistead had four gun batteries: Battery Winchester with one 12-inch M1888 disappearing gun, Battery McFarland with three 8-inch M1888 disappearing guns, Battery Irons with two 4.72-inch 45 caliber Armstrong guns on pedestal mounts, and Battery Mudge with two 3-inch M1898 guns on masking parapet (retractable) mounts. Battery Winchester was named for James Winchester, a Maryland officer in the Revolutionary War and a general in the War of 1812. Battery McFarland was named for Daniel McFarland, an officer killed in the War of 1812. Battery Irons was named for Joseph Irons, killed in the Mexican–American War. Battery Mudge was named for Robert R. Mudge, killed in action against the Seminoles. The fort also included a mine casemate and command station to control a naval minefield in the harbor.

Battery Irons had been added to Fort Armistead as part of a series of measures to quickly deploy modern weapons to the East Coast after the outbreak of the Spanish–American War in 1898. The Endicott Program was still years from completion, and it was feared the Spanish fleet would bombard the U.S. Battery Irons was disarmed in 1913 and the guns sent to Fort Ruger in Hawaii.

After the American entry into World War I in April 1917, many guns were removed from coast defenses for potential service on the Western Front. Most of these weapons were not sent overseas or did not see action; however, most of the heavy guns in the Baltimore area were dismounted in 1917–18 and not returned to the forts. Battery McFarland's three 8-inch guns were removed in 1917 for potential use as railway artillery, while Battery Winchester's 12-inch gun was sent to Fort Wadsworth, Staten Island, New York to replace a gun sent to the railway artillery program. With the war over, in 1920 Fort Armistead's service came to a close; Battery Mudge's 3-inch guns were scrapped as part of a general withdrawal from service of the 3-inch M1898 gun type.

In World War II (1939/41 - 1945), the fort site was briefly reclaimed by the military and used by the United States Navy for ammunition storage. In 1952–54 a four-gun 90 mm anti-aircraft battery was stationed on site.

Present
After World War I, the fort property was declared surplus and abandoned by the United States Department of War and the U.S. Army in 1923. Five years later it was turned over to the City of Baltimore's Department of Recreation and Parks (Bureau of Parks). It is now a Baltimore city park. In 1975-1977, the Hawkins Point area was impacted by the construction of the Outer Harbor Crossing carrying the Baltimore Beltway (Interstate 695) over the Patapsco Harbor, named the Francis Scott Key Bridge, which now towers over the 1890s era seacoast defense site below.

See also
 Seacoast defense in the United States
 United States Army Coast Artillery Corps

References

External links
 List of all US coastal forts and batteries at the Coast Defense Study Group, Inc. website
 FortWiki, lists most CONUS and Canadian forts

1901 establishments in Maryland
Armistead
Government buildings in Baltimore
Hawkins Point, Baltimore
Parks in Baltimore